Phantom Blues is a studio album by American blues artist Taj Mahal.

Track listing
 "Lovin' in My Baby's Eyes" (Taj Mahal)
 "Cheatin' On You" (Jon Cleary)
 "The Hustle Is On" (H.E. Owens)
 "Here in the Dark" (Bernard Anders)
 "Fanning the Flames" (Jon Cleary)
 "I Need Your Loving" (Clarence Lewis, Don Gardner, James McDougal, Morris Levy)
 "Ooh Poo Pah Doo" (Jessie Hill)
 "Lonely Avenue" (Doc Pomus)
 "Don't Tell Me" (Pat McLaughlin)
 "What Am I Living For?" (Art Harris, Fred Jay)
 "We're Gonna Make It" (Billy Davis, Carl William Smith, Gene Barge, Raynard Miner)
 "Let the Four Winds Blow" (Dave Bartholomew, Antoine "Fats" Domino)
 "(You've Got to) Love Her with a Feeling" (Freddie King, Sonny Thompson)
 "The Car of Your Dreams" (James Kelly)

Personnel
Taj Mahal - lead vocals, dobro
Bonnie Raitt - lead vocals on "I Need Your Loving"
Dean Parks, Eric Clapton - lead guitar
Joe McGrath, John Parks, Johnny Lee Schell - guitar
Mike Campbell - 12-string guitar
John Porter - lead, acoustic and slide guitar
James "Hutch" Hutchinson, Larry Fulcher - bass guitar
David Hidalgo - accordion
Jon Brion - guitar, Chamberlin
Jon Cleary - guitar, piano, Wurlitzer, clarinet
Mick Weaver - organ
Tony Braunagel - drums, percussion
Myric "Freeze" Guillory - rubboard
Bernard "Dr. B." Anderson, Joe Sublett - tenor saxophone
Darrell Leonard - trumpet, trombone
Alfie Silas Durio, Billie Barnum, Sir Harry Bowens, Regina Taylor, Sweat Pea Atkinson, Terrence Forsythe - backing vocals

References

Taj Mahal (musician) albums
1996 albums
Albums produced by John Porter (musician)
Private Music albums